É is the debut album by Brazilian singer Duda Brack, released independently on 7 April 2015. It was produced by Bruno Giorgi, Lenine's son.

According to Brack, she researched references for the album cover art and, two months before its release, she found a picture taken by Flora Borsi from Hungary, who told her that particular photograph had already been sold to Adobe Photoshop, but that she could use pictures from another collection, and one of them ended up becoming the final cover.

Critical reception 

Writing for his blog Notas Musicais, Mauro Ferreira gave the album 5 stars, and called Brack "capricious", "aggressive", "incendiary" and "maddened", pointing out that she "debuted in an insane market with a suicidal album, commercial-wise".

Thales de Menezes, at Folha de S.Paulo, gave the album 3 out of 5 stars. He praised her voice and her performance, but noticed some hoarseness on her voice that would be typical of older singers.

Track listing

References 

Portuguese-language albums
2015 debut albums
Duda Brack albums